John Lanigan (1803 – 1868) was an Irish Liberal politician.

He was elected as the Member of Parliament (MP) for Cashel at the 1859 general election but was defeated at the next general election, in 1865.

Lanigan married Mary Ann O'Keeffe (Charles O'Keeffe and Letitia (Yelverton) O'Keeffe) they had two sons Charles O'Keeffe Lanigan and Stephen Charles William O'Keeffe Lanigan. He died on the 25th of August 1868 in Templemore, County Tipperary, and is buried in Glasnevin, Dublin.

References

External links
 

1803 births
1868 deaths
Irish Liberal Party MPs
Members of the Parliament of the United Kingdom for County Tipperary constituencies (1801–1922)
UK MPs 1859–1865
John